The 2012 Korea Grand Prix Gold was the fifteenth badminton tournament of the 2012 BWF Grand Prix Gold and Grand Prix. The tournament was held in Lee Yongdae Gymnasium, Hwasun, South Korea from 4 to 9 December 2012 and had a total purse of $120,000.

Men's singles

Seeds

  Mohd Arif Abdul Latif (semi-final)
  Niluka Karunaratne (quarter-final)
  Brice Leverdez (third round)
  Tanongsak Saensomboonsuk (final)
  Derek Wong Zi Liang (semi-final)
  Misha Zilberman (second round)
  Ramdan Misbun (second round)
  Iskandar Zulkarnain Zainuddin (third round)

Finals

Top half

Section 1

Section 2

Section 3

Section 4

Bottom half

Section 5

Section 6

Section 7

Section 8

Women's singles

Seeds

  Sung Ji-hyun (champion)
  Aprilia Yuswandari (final)
  Tee Jing Yi (withdrew)
  Sannatasah Saniru (first round)
  Lydia Cheah Li Ya (first round)
  Sonia Cheah Su Ya (semi-final)
  Chen Jiayuan (quarter-final)
  Akvile Stapusaityte (first round)

Finals

Top half

Section 1

Section 2

Bottom half

Section 3

Section 4

Men's doubles

Seeds

  Kim Ki-jung / Kim Sa-rang (final)
  Jurgen Koch / Peter Zauner (withdrew)
  Adrian Liu / Derrick Ng (second round)
  Lukasz Moren / Wojciech Szkudlarczyk (second round)
  Ko Sung-hyun / Lee Yong-dae (champion)
  Andrei Adistia / Christopher Rusdianto (first round)
  Nelson Heg Wei Keat / Teo Ee Yi (first round)
  Chooi Kah Ming / Ow Yao Han (quarter-final)

Finals

Top half

Section 1

Section 2

Bottom half

Section 3

Section 4

Women's doubles

Seeds

  Eom Hye-won / Jang Ye-na (champion)
  Choi Hye-in / Kim So-young (second round)
  Lee So-hee / Shin Seung-chan (final)
  Chow Mei Kuan / Lee Meng Yean (second round)

Finals

Top half

Section 1

Section 2

Bottom half

Section 3

Section 4

Mixed doubles

Seeds

  Yoo Yeon-seong / Jang Ye-na (final)
  Irfan Fadhilah / Weni Anggraini (semi-final)
  Alfian Eko Prasetya / Gloria Emanuelle Widjaja (second round)
  Shin Baek-cheol / Eom Hye-won (champion)

Finals

Top half

Section 1

Section 2

Bottom half

Section 3

Section 4

References

External links
 Tournament link

Korea Masters
Korea
2012 in South Korean sport
Sport in South Jeolla Province
Korea Grand Prix Gold
December 2012 sports events in South Korea